is a video game developed by Acquire and published by Spike for the PlayStation 3. It was released in Japan on March 3, 2011.

An English version was announced on January 19, 2012 by Rising Star Games. The release of the game in Europe was on October 5, 2012. On April 4, 2012, XSEED Games published the game for the U.S. as a downloadable title on PlayStation Network with a release date of August 21, 2012. The game was initially PlayStation 3 only, however the game was later released for Microsoft Windows by Ghostlight on July 23, 2015.

Plot
The game is set in a fictional port town called Amihama during the last days of the Shogunate. Players can create their own samurai and choose to align themselves with one of three factions: the pro-government forces, the anti-government rebels seeking to repel foreigners, or the British Navy stationed in the city to negotiate a peace treaty. When the negotiations between the local government of Amihama and the British goes wrong after a Prajna attack at the meeting point, the Tokugawa Shogunate sends one of their Tairō to quash the revolt.

The main story takes place over the span of five days. The character's decisions and actions will shape their path, and ultimately, their fate.

Gameplay
Endings, Events, and Customization Acquire promised that 4 would be much longer than previous games, and there are 10 endings. The game also features flexible events and cutscenes such as deciding whether you want to explore a cave or just turn around and walk away. Events are easier to follow, compared to previous games. There are more customization options than in the last game, allowing to choose features such as face, hair, clothing, footwear and accessories.

Health and Energy An energy meter is added in this installment. It regenerates life points (which are set at 1000) if the player is stationary or moving away in combat, and depletes when your samurai fights, nightcrawls, or is regenerating health. Food and sleep regenerate the energy meter. There are straw blankets in set locations outside (or in) the dojo, inns around Amihama where you pay to sleep in, and any bed you can stand on can be used to sleep and recharge energy.

Combat There is a wide variety of fighting styles and skills that a player can master. Swords can now be switched to any stance; and skills, once learned, are bound to the player, not the swords. Players then can assign learned skills to their own "school" of fighting style.
The "push and pull" mechanics in the first and third games are kept. A new special mode is introduced, in which the samurai enters slow motion for a limited duration and can slash enemies repeatedly, then he sheathes the sword and all dead enemies fall down at the same time.
The sword "heat" mechanics was removed and replaced by "durability points", which will drop gradually with use, and eventually weapons will break. This forces players to visit the blacksmith regularly for repairs, unless their weapons are "unbreakable".

Sword Enhancement/Creation Players can go to the blacksmith and choose to enhance their weapon's attributes (attack, defense, durability), repair it, or appraise it. Player can also ask Dojima to melt a sword and then use the metal to recast another sword.
The custom sword-making system introduced in Way of the Samurai 3 returns. In addition to normal parts like blade, hilt and grip, players can also add a charm that will give a special effect. Beside swords and spears, pistols and muskets have been added as weapons. Muskets are primarily used by British soldiers.

New features
Proof of Life Player's actions will affect the game world in the next replay. For example, if players killed a lot of town people in the last game, there will be more guards to hunt them down. There are many foreigners in the game; but unlike the previous game, at the beginning the protagonist will not be able to understand what they say (the texts will appear as "?????"). Players can convince the Shogunate to open a school to teach foreign languages, and later the player will be able talk to foreigners.

Night Crawling There is a minigame called "Yobai" in which a samurai can romance a NPC by sneaking into their home at night, avoiding or knocking out family members, and pulling out the right futon to find them. Even then, they will offer playful resistance, and player must try to throw them into bed. A turtle head will guide the samurai to their target. The player can practice "night crawling" with most male and female characters in the game, as long as the requirements are fulfilled.

Torture Once arrested for doing bad deeds, the player's character will be sent to the torture room, to play some hellish minigames with the three beautiful Kinugawa sisters. The tortures include riding a flaming wooden horse, being tied to a water wheel, and being pelted by huge stones. If the samurai survives the torture, the sisters will be impressed, and he can then practice "night crawling" with them.

Minigames Beside various jobs that the samurai can get from different sources, players can earn money by going fishing, working as an assassin, delivering love letters, or by flirting with foreign women. The samurai can also play poker at the casino, and hanafuda at the gambling parlor.

Dojo Players can open their own dojo, take on apprentices, and fend off challengers. The reputation of the dojo depends on the number of apprentices, and their quality. The player can tell any of the apprentices to "follow me", and they will fight alongside him.

Crossroads Killing When connected to PSN, character data will be automatically uploaded and transferred into other players' game worlds, where he would appear as a wandering samurai (NPC), and players can defeat him to obtain the custom sword that another player created. This is called online tsujigiri.

Downloadable content
A Shinsengumi costume DLC pack was offered for free from March 24 to April 27, 2011. After that, it was priced $6. Players need to apply a patch before using any downloadable content.

Hijikata Toshizō and Kondō Isami are among the downloadable Shinsengumi characters.

Dona Dona from the original Way of the Samurai and a grown-up version of the character Sayo from Way of the Samurai 2 are also available for download. Sayo will appear in the road and offer rice balls.

Reception

Upon the release the game received mixed reviews, with PlayStation 3 version scoring 58 out of 100 on review aggregator site Metacritic. Many critics praised the story, customisation options, various non-combat activities and multiple endings, however, the gameplay, bugs and technical issues were criticised.

PC port received mixed to positive reviews, scoring 72 out of 100 on Metacritic.

Plus version
On January 26, 2012, Way of the Samurai 4 was repackaged, bundled with all DLCs, and re-released as "Way of the Samurai 4 Plus" (at half price). Sakamoto Ryōma is available as playable character in this version.

References

External links
Developer website

2011 video games
Action-adventure games
Open-world video games
PlayStation 3 games
Video games about samurai
Video game sequels
Video games developed in Japan
Video games scored by Noriyuki Asakura
Video games set in feudal Japan
Video games with historical settings
Windows games
Chunsoft games
Rising Star Games games
Single-player video games
Xseed Games games
Nippon Ichi Software games
Acquire (company) games
Ghostlight games